Jewell Loyd (born October 5, 1993) is an American professional basketball player for Perfumerias Avenida of Spain's Liga Femenina de Baloncesto and the Seattle Storm of the Women's National Basketball Association (WNBA).  She was drafted first overall in the 2015 WNBA draft by the Seattle Storm. She played college basketball at Notre Dame.

High school & college
Born in Lincolnwood, Illinois, Loyd was a four-year starter for Niles West High School in Skokie, Illinois, where she averaged 24.8 points and 11.9 rebounds per game and scored 3,077 career points, leading the team to a 93–31 record during that time.

In her final season for Notre Dame, she was named ESPN's women's college basketball player of the year as the Fighting Irish advanced to the NCAA championship game for the second year in a row. Loyd scored 1,909 points in her college career, Notre Dame's fifth-highest total ever.

Notre Dame statistics
Source

Professional career

WNBA
Loyd was drafted first overall in the 2015 WNBA Draft by the Seattle Storm. She played alongside superstar veteran point guard Sue Bird. Loyd played the point guard position prior to her WNBA career, but with Bird already playing point guard for the Storm, Loyd instead played as a shooting guard. Loyd was also a back-up point guard in her rookie season for the Storm. While Bird sat out the final seven games of the regular season to rest, Loyd was the starting point guard. Loyd played 34 games with 23 starts in her rookie season for the Storm. Her season performance earned her the WNBA Rookie of the Year Award, while she averaged 10.7 ppg.

In her second season, Loyd developed into a star player and was the starting shooting guard for the Storm, averaging 16.5 ppg. During the season, Loyd scored a career-high 32 points in a win against the Phoenix Mercury. Loyd was also named to the All-WNBA Second Team. The Storm made it back to the playoffs for the first time in three years with the number 7 seed in the league. In her first career playoff game, Loyd scored 24 points in a 94–85 loss to the Atlanta Dream in the first round elimination game.

In the 2017 season, Loyd's offensive scoring numbers increased. She scored a new career-high of 33 points in a 75–71 loss to the Phoenix Mercury. By the end of the season, Loyd averaged a career-high 17.7 ppg. The Storm finished off the season as the number 8 seed in the league with a 15–19 record. The Storm were defeated 79–69 by the Phoenix Mercury in the first round elimination game, Loyd scored 17 points in the loss.

On July 20, 2018, Loyd scored a season-high 31 points in a 78–65 victory against the Connecticut Sun. In the 2018 season, Loyd was voted into the 2018 WNBA All-Star Game, making it her first career all-star appearance. Loyd finished off the season, averaging 15.5 ppg as the Storm finished 26–8 with the number 1 seed in the league, receiving a double-bye to the semi-finals and homecourt advantage. In the semi-finals, the Storm defeated the Phoenix Mercury in five games, advancing to the WNBA Finals for the first time since 2010. In the Finals, the Storm defeated the Washington Mystics in a three-game sweep, winning their first championship in 8 years.

On June 21, 2019, Loyd scored a season-high 23 points while tying a career-high 5 three-pointers in an 82–64 victory over the Los Angeles Sparks. Loyd would also make her second all-star appearance in the 2019 season. By the end of the season, the Storm were the number 6 seed with an 18–16 record. The Storm were unable to defend their title in the playoffs as they were eliminated in the second round elimination game by the Sparks.

In 2020, the season was delayed and shortened to 22 games in a bubble at IMG Academy due to the COVID-19 pandemic. On August 20, 2020, Loyd scored a new career-high 35 points in a 90–84 loss to the Indiana Fever, despite the pandemic the Storm had a fully loaded roster and finished 18–4 with the number two seed, receiving a double bye to the semi-finals. In the semi-finals, the Storm would sweep the Minnesota Lynx in three games, advancing back to the Finals for the second time in three years. In the Finals, the Storm would win the championship after sweeping the Las Vegas Aces, earning Loyd her second championship.

In 2021, The No. 1 overall pick in the 2015 WNBA Draft was named to the All-WNBA First team.  Lloyd averaged 17.9 points (seventh in the WNBA), 3.8 assists (12th) and 1.48 steals (seventh).  On Sept. 17 against Phoenix, Loyd scored a career-high 37 points – the most points by a player in a game in the 2021 season – and tied a league record with 22 points in a quarter.

Overseas
After her rookie WNBA season, Loyd played for Galatasaray in Turkey during the 2015–16 offseason. She averaged 14.9 ppg, 3.9 rpg and 2.3 apg in 17 games. In August 2016, Loyd signed with the Shanxi Flame of the Chinese League for the 2016–17 offseason. In 2017, Loyd signed with Guri KDB Life Winnus of the Korean League for the 2017–18 offseason. In August 2018, Loyd signed with Botaş SK of the Turkish League for the 2018–19 season. In 2019, Loyd signed with Perfumerías Avenida of the Spanish League for the 2019-20 offseason.

WNBA career statistics

Regular season

|-
| style="text-align:left;"| 2015
| style="text-align:left;"| Seattle
| 34 || 23 || 25.9 || .411 || .208 || .904 || 3.5 || 1.9 || 0.5 || 0.2 || 2.0 || 10.7
|-
| style="text-align:left;"| 2016
| style="text-align:left;"| Seattle
| 34 || 34 || 31.6 || .431 || .303 || .891 || 3.4 || 3.4 || 1.2 || 0.2 || 2.2 || 16.5
|-
| style="text-align:left;"| 2017
| style="text-align:left;"| Seattle
| 34 || 34 || 31.1 || .431 || .386 || .863 || 3.4 || 3.4 || 1.2 || 0.3 || 2.5 || 17.7
|-
|style="text-align:left;background:#afe6ba;"| 2018†
| style="text-align:left;"| Seattle
| 34 || 34 || 29.7 || .423 || .370 || .851 || 4.6 || 3.7 || 1.2 || 0.1 || 1.9 || 15.5
|-
| style="text-align:left;"| 2019
| style="text-align:left;"| Seattle
| 27 || 21 || 25.4 || .391 || .337 || .928 || 2.7 || 2.0 || 1.3 || 0.1 || 1.9 || 12.3
|-
|style="text-align:left;background:#afe6ba;"|2020†
| style="text-align:left;"| Seattle
| 22 || 22 || 27.9 || .443 || .390 || .875  || 2.4 || 3.2 || 1.5 || 0.3 || 1.9 || 15.5
|-
|style="text-align:left;"|2021
| style="text-align:left;"| Seattle
| 31 || 31 || 31.0 || .420 || .376 || .889  || 4.0 || 3.8 || 1.5 || 0.2 || 2.3 || 17.9
|-
| style="text-align:left;"| 2022
| style="text-align:left;"| Seattle
| 36 || 36 || 30.3 || .396 || .385 || .893 || 2.6 || 3.4 || 1.1 || 0.2 || 2.2 || 16.3
|-
| style="text-align:left;"| Career
| style="text-align:left;"| 8 years, 1 team
| 252 || 235 || 29.3 || .418 || .360 || .884 || 3.4 || 3.1 || 1.2 || 0.2 || 2.1 || 15.3

Postseason

|-
| style="text-align:left;"| 2016
| style="text-align:left;"| Seattle
| 1 || 1 || 33.1 || .444 || .333 || .833 || 4.0 || 2.0 || 0.0 || 0.0 || 0.0 || 24.0
|-
| style="text-align:left;"| 2017
| style="text-align:left;"| Seattle
| 1 || 1 || 30.7 || .286 || .333 || 1.000 || 5.0 || 1.0|| 3.0 || 0.0 || 2.0 || 17.0
|-
|style="text-align:left;background:#afe6ba;"| 2018†
| style="text-align:left;"| Seattle
| 8 || 8 || 30.7 || .378 || .241 || .759 || 5.0 || 3.3 || 0.7 || 0.3 || 1.8 || 12.1
|-
| style="text-align:left;"| 2019
| style="text-align:left;"| Seattle
| 2 || 2 || 27.5 || .455 || .556 || .889 || 2.0 || 3.5 || 1.5 || 0.5 || 2.0 || 16.5
|-
|style="text-align:left;background:#afe6ba;"|2020†
| style="text-align:left;"| Seattle
| 6 || 6 || 30.2 || .554 || .393 || .933 || 5.2 || 3.8 || 1.3 || 0.5 || 2.3 || 17.8
|-
| style="text-align:left;"| 2021
| style="text-align:left;"| Seattle
| 1 || 1 || 36.0 || .208 || .000 || 1.000 || 3.0 || 5.0 || 1.0 || 2.0 || 3.0 || 15.0
|-
| style="text-align:left;"| 2022
| style="text-align:left;"| Seattle
| 6 || 6 || 37.0 || .389 || .357 || .929 || 2.3 || 2.5 || 0.5 || 0.0 || 1.0 || 19.2
|-
| style="text-align:left;"| Career
| style="text-align:left;"| 7 years, 1 team
| 25 || 25 || 32.3 || .412 || .331 || .879|| 4.0 || 3.2 || 1.0 || 0.4 || 1.8 || 16.3

Awards and honors
2015—WNBA Rookie of the Year
2017—All-WNBA Second Team
2021—All-WNBA First Team
WNBA Champion 2018
WNBA Champion 2020

References

External links

Notre Dame Fighting Irish bio

1993 births
Living people
All-American college women's basketball players
American expatriate basketball people in China
American expatriate basketball people in South Korea
American expatriate basketball people in Turkey
American women's 3x3 basketball players
American women's basketball players
Basketball players at the 2020 Summer Olympics
Basketball players from Illinois
Botaş SK players
Galatasaray S.K. (women's basketball) players
LGBT basketball players
LGBT people from Illinois
Lesbian sportswomen
McDonald's High School All-Americans
Medalists at the 2020 Summer Olympics
Notre Dame Fighting Irish women's basketball players
Olympic gold medalists for the United States in basketball
Parade High School All-Americans (girls' basketball)
People from Lincolnwood, Illinois
Point guards
Seattle Storm draft picks
Seattle Storm players
Shanxi Flame players
Sportspeople from Cook County, Illinois
Women's National Basketball Association first-overall draft picks
Women's National Basketball Association All-Stars
United States women's national basketball team players